Pajaro Valley Unified School District is a school district based in Watsonville, California, USA. The Superintendent is Michelle Rodriguez. The District is overseen by a seven members of the Board of Trustees that meets an average of twice a month.

Boundary
Pajaro Valley serves the eastern half of Santa Cruz County, a portion of northern Monterey County and a small section of San Benito County. The communities located within the district are the city of Watsonville and the CDPs of Amesti, Aptos, Aptos Hills-Larkin Valley, Aromas, Corralitos, Day Valley, Freedom, Interlaken, La Selva Beach, Los Lomas, Pajaro, Pajaro Dunes, Prunedale, Rio del Mar and Seacliff.

Schools

Central Zone
 Amesti Elementary School
 Calabasas Elementary School
 Freedom Elementary School
 H.A. Hyde Elementary School
 Landmark Elementary School
 Starlight Elementary School
 Cesar Chavez Middle School
 Lakeview Middle School
 Rolling Hills Middle School
 Pajaro Valley High School

North Zone
 Bradley Elementary School
 Mar Vista Elementary School
 Rio Del Mar Elementary School
 Valencia Elementary School
 Aptos Junior High
 Aptos High School

South Zone
 Ann Soldo Elementary School
 Hall District Elementary School
 Mintie White Elementary School
 MacQuiddy Elementary School
 Ohlone Elementary School
 Radcliff Elementary School
 E.A. Hall Middle School
 Pajaro Middle School
 Watsonville High School

References

External links
 

School districts in Santa Cruz County, California
Watsonville, California